The Library of Congress Classification (LCC) is a system of library classification developed by the Library of Congress in the United States, which can be used for shelving books in a library. LCC is mainly used by large research and academic libraries, while most public libraries and small academic libraries used the Dewey Decimal Classification system. The classification was developed by James Hanson (chief of the Catalog Department), with assistance from Charles Martel, in 1897, while they were working at the Library of Congress. It was designed specifically for the purposes and collection of the Library of Congress to replace the fixed location system developed by Thomas Jefferson.

LCC has been criticized for lacking a sound theoretical basis; many of the classification decisions were driven by the practical needs of that library rather than epistemological considerations. Although it divides subjects into broad categories, it is essentially enumerative in nature. That is, it provides a guide to the books actually in one library's collections, not a classification of the world.

History 
The central core of the modern Library of Congress was formed from books sold to the government by Thomas Jefferson after the original collection was razed by the British in the War of 1812. As a result, the original classification system used by the library was of his own invention. However, by the end of the nineteenth century, the collection had grown to over a million volumes and his system was deemed too unwieldy.

John Russell Young, the seventh Librarian of Congress, hired James Hanson and Charles Martel in 1897, who began the development of a new classification system that would more accurately describe the collections the library held. Young's tenure as Librarian ended with his death in 1899, and his successor, Herbert Putnam, continued to implement the updates to the catalog through his long stay in the office. By the time he departed from his post in 1939, all the classes except K (Law) were well developed.

In creating their classification system, Hanson and Martel evaluated several systems already in existence, including the Dewey Decimal System, Charles Ammi Cutter's Cutter Expansive Classification, the Index Medius, and the Putnam Classification System (developed while Putnam was head librarian at the Minneapolis Public Library). The one closest to their needs was Cutter's; however, he died before the completion of his system. Hanson and Martel thus decided to develop their own unique system, strongly based on his ideas. They published their first outline of the classification scheme in 1904. Development of the classes continued throughout the twentieth century. The last class to be developed was K (Law): the first K schedule was published in 1969 and not being completed until the 2004 publication of KB.

From 1996 onwards, the LCC schedules were available online, and since 2013, there have been no new print editions of the classification system. All updates are now distributed by the Library's Cataloging Distribution Service entirely online.

Design and organization 
LCC divides all knowledge into twenty-one basic classes, exchanges given a single letter of the alphabet as an identifier. The vast majority of these classes are divided further into two and three level sub-classes. With these sub-classes, numerical ranges are assigned to topics, going from more general to more specific. Unlike in the Dewey Decimal Classification, where the numbers assigned to a topic iterate throughout the system (e.g., the ".05" tag indicated a periodical publication on the topic), the LCC numerical ranges are strictly hierarchal, only corresponding to their level on the outline. LCC is enumerative, meaning that it lists all the classes in officially published schedules, which are updated as needed by the Library of Congress. 

After the range of numbers making up the topical division, call numbers often also include one or more Cutter numbers, modeled after the unfinished Cutter Expansive Classification index. The full LCC schedules contain tables that describe Cutter numbers for certain types of media, collections of work, and geographical areas. Cutter numbers also can take the form of an author-specific code, containing a letter and several numbers corresponding to the author's last name. This serves to further distinguish publications and nominally alphabetize volumes within a topic section. The final component of a typical LCC call-number is the publication year, in full. Library collections can add modifiers to distinguish specific volumes, such as "Copy 1."

LCC should not be confused with Library of Congress Control Numbers (LCCN), which are assigned to all books (and authors) and defines online catalog entries. Library of Congress Classification is also distinct from Library of Congress Subject Headings, the system of labels such as "Glaciers" and "Glaciers—Fiction" that describe contents systematically.

One variation from the original LCC system is the National Library of Medicine classification system (NLM), which uses the initial letters W and QS–QZ, which are not used by LCC. Some libraries use NLM in conjunction with LCC, eschewing LCC's R, QM, and QP, which overlap with NLM's schema. Another is the Canadian Universities and the Canadian National Library using FC for Canadian History, a subclass that LCC has not officially adopted, but which it has agreed not to use for anything else.

Classes

Use and criticism 

Together with the Dewey Decimal System (DDC), LCC make up the two main classification system used in U.S. libraries. LCC is favored by large academic and research libraries.

Systems of classification can be evaluated on several metrics, including expressiveness (the ability of the numeration system to express the hierarchal and correlative relationships between topics), hospitality (the ability of the system to accommodate new subjects), and brevity (length of call numbers). While LCC is significantly less expressive than DDC, it is extremely hospitable, mainly in the fact that five class (I, O, W, X, and Y) lack any assignment to topics. LCC call numbers also tend to be shorter than those in DDC.

The main difference between DDC and LCC is their approach to classifying. Dewey's system is a comprehensive classification to all topics, with no regard to the actual collections a library might hold. While this has allowed it to be successfully adapted into more modern classification systems for use outside of libraries, such as the Universal Decimal Classification (UDC), it does make it more unwieldy for large or specialized collections. On the other hand, Hanson and Martel designed LCC specifically for library use, which means while it does not completely enumerate the world, it does more reflect what books a library might hold.

Because LCC was designed around the collections of the Library of Congress, it has an American, European, and Christian bias, as reflected mainly in the earlier developed schedules of D (World History), E and F (History of the Americas), and B (Philosophy, Psychology, Religion). On the other hand, the later-developed K (Law) gives fairly even weight to global law. Today, the various schedules are maintained and revised by the Library's Policy and Standards Division, in conjunction with experts in each field. However, updating various schedules with classification biases is generally assumed to be impractical due to the massive workload that would result in,  especially as the "discipline" based classes of LCC have been entrenched in the average library user's mind.

Like all classification systems, LCC struggles with catering to interdisciplinary scholars and topics, as ultimately, a book can only be shelved in a single location.  Additionally, LCC has a problem with "othering" marginalized groups, making works related to or authored by members of these groups particularly difficult to locate. This is not a new issue, and libraries with more specialized collections about minority groups or issues sometimes eschew LCC, with one example alternative classification being the Harvard–Yenching Classification, specifically developed for Chinese language materials.

Full classification outline

Class A – General Works

 Subclass AC – Collections. Series. Collected works
 Subclass AE – Encyclopedias
 Subclass AG – Dictionaries and other general reference works
 Subclass AI – Indexes
 Subclass AM – Museums. Collectors and collecting
 Subclass AN – Newspapers
 Subclass AP – Periodicals
 Subclass AS – Academies and learned societies
 Subclass AY – Yearbooks. Almanacs. Directories
 Subclass AZ – History of scholarship and learning. The humanities

Class B – Philosophy, Psychology, Religion

 Subclass B – Philosophy (General)
 Subclass BC – Logic
 Subclass BD – Speculative philosophy
 Subclass BF – Psychology
 Subclass BH – Aesthetics
 Subclass BJ – Ethics
 Subclass BL – Religions. Mythology. Rationalism
 Subclass BM – Judaism
 Subclass BP – Islam. Baháʼísm. Theosophy, etc.
 Subclass BQ – Buddhism
 Subclass BR – Christianity
 Subclass BS – The Bible
 Subclass BT – Doctrinal theology
 Subclass BV – Practical theology
 Subclass BX – Christian Denominations

Class C – Auxiliary Sciences of History

 Subclass C – Auxiliary Sciences of History
 Subclass CB – History of Civilization
 Subclass CC – Archaeology
 Subclass CD – Diplomatics. Archives. Seals
 Subclass CE – Technical Chronology; Calendar
 Subclass CJ – Numismatics
 Subclass CN – Inscriptions; Epigraphy
 Subclass CR – Heraldry
 Subclass CS – Genealogy
 Subclass CT – Biography

Class D – World History and History of Europe, Asia, Africa, Australia, New Zealand, etc.

 Subclass D – History (General)
 Subclass DA – Great Britain
 Subclass DAW – Central Europe
 Subclass DB – Austria – Liechtenstein – Hungary – Czechoslovakia
 Subclass DC – France – Andorra – Monaco
 Subclass DD – Germany
 Subclass DE – Greco-Roman World
 Subclass DF – Greece
 Subclass DG – Italy – Malta
 Subclass DH – Low Countries – Benelux Countries
 Subclass DJ – Netherlands (Holland)
 Subclass DJK – Eastern Europe (General)
 Subclass DK – Russia. Soviet Union. Former Soviet Republics – Poland
 Subclass DL – Northern Europe. Scandinavia
 Subclass DP – Spain – Portugal
 Subclass DQ – Switzerland
 Subclass DR – Balkan Peninsula
 Subclass DS – Asia
 Subclass DT – Africa
 Subclass DU – Oceania (South Seas)
 Subclass DX – Romanies

Class E  – History of America

 Class E does not have any subclasses.

Class F – Local History of the Americas

Class F does not have any subclasses, though Canadian Universities and the Canadian National Library use FC for Canadian History, a subclass that LCC has not officially adopted, but which it has agreed not to use for anything else.

Class G – Geography, Anthropology, Recreation

 Subclass G – Geography (General). Atlases. Maps
 Subclass GA – Mathematical geography. Cartography
 Subclass GB – Physical geography
 Subclass GC – Oceanography
 Subclass GE – Environmental Sciences
 Subclass GF – Human ecology. Anthropogeography
 Subclass GN – Anthropology
 Subclass GR – Folklore
 Subclass GT – Manners and customs (General)
 Subclass GV – Recreation. Leisure

Class H – Social Sciences

 Subclass H – Social sciences (General)
 Subclass HA – Statistics
 Subclass HB – Economic theory. Demography
 Subclass HC – Economic history and conditions
 Subclass HD – Industries. Land use. Labor
 Subclass HE – Transportation and communications
 Subclass HF – Commerce
 Subclass HG – Finance
 Subclass HJ – Public finance
 Subclass HM – Sociology (General)
 Subclass HN – Social history and conditions. Social problems. Social reform
 Subclass HQ – The family. Marriage, Women and Sexuality
 Subclass HS – Societies: secret, benevolent, etc.
 Subclass HT – Communities. Classes. Races
 Subclass HV – Social pathology. Social and public welfare. Criminology
 Subclass HX – Socialism. Communism. Anarchism

Class J – Political Science

 Subclass J – General legislative and executive papers
 Subclass JA – Political science (General)
 Subclass JC – Political theory
 Subclass JF – Political institutions and public administration
 Subclass JJ – Political institutions and public administration (North America)
 Subclass JK – Political institutions and public administration (United States)
 Subclass JL – Political institutions and public administration (Canada, Latin America, etc.)
 Subclass JN – Political institutions and public administration (Europe)
 Subclass JQ – Political institutions and public administration (Asia, Africa, Australia, Pacific Area, etc.)
 Subclass JS – Local government. Municipal government
 Subclass JV – Colonies and colonization. Emigration and immigration. International migration
 Subclass JX – International law, see JZ and KZ (obsolete)
 Subclass JZ – International relations

Class K – Law

 Subclass K – Law in general. Comparative and uniform law. Jurisprudence
 Subclass KB – Religious law in general. Comparative religious law. Jurisprudence
 Subclass KBM – Jewish law
 Subclass KBP – Islamic law
 Subclass KBR – History of canon law
 Subclass KBS – Canon law of Eastern churches
 Subclass KBT – Canon law of Eastern Rite Churches in Communion with the Holy See of Rome
 Subclass KBU – Law of the Roman Catholic Church. The Holy See
 Subclasses – KD/KDK - United Kingdom and Ireland
 Subclass KDZ – America. North America
 Subclass KE – Canada
 Subclass KF – United States
 Subclass KG – Latin America – Mexico and Central America – West Indies. Caribbean area
 Subclass KH – South America
 Subclasses KJ-KKZ – Europe
 Subclasses KL-KWX – Asia and Eurasia, Africa, Pacific Area, and Antarctica
 Subclass KU/KUQ – Law of Australia and New Zealand
 Subclass KZ – Law of nations

Class L – Education

 Subclass L – Education (General)
 Subclass LA – History of education
 Subclass LB – Theory and practice of education
 Subclass LC – Special aspects of education
 Subclass LD – Individual institutions – United States
 Subclass LE – Individual institutions – America (except United States)
 Subclass LF – Individual institutions – Europe
 Subclass LG – Individual institutions – Asia, Africa, Indian Ocean islands, Australia, New Zealand, Pacific islands
 Subclass LH – College and school magazines and papers
 Subclass LJ – Student fraternities and societies, United States
 Subclass LT – Textbooks

Class M – Music

 Subclass M – Music
 Subclass ML – Literature on music
 Subclass MT – Instruction and study

Class N – Fine Arts

 Subclass N – Visual Arts
 Subclass NA – Architecture
 Subclass NB – Sculpture
 Subclass NC – Drawing. Design. Illustration
 Subclass ND – Painting
 Subclass NE – Print media
 Subclass NK – Decorative arts
 Subclass NX – Arts in general

Class P – Language and Literature

 Subclass P – Philology. Linguistics
 Subclass PA – Greek language and literature. Latin language and literature
 Subclass PB – Modern languages. Celtic languages and literature
 Subclass PC – Romanic languages
 Subclass PD – Germanic languages. Scandinavian languages
 Subclass PE – English language
 Subclass PF – West Germanic languages
 Subclass PG – Slavic languages and literature. Baltic languages. Albanian language
 Subclass PH – Uralic languages. Basque language
 Subclass PJ – Oriental languages and literatures
 Subclass PK – Indo-Iranian languages and literature
 Subclass PL – Languages and literature of Eastern Asia, Africa, Oceania
 Subclass PM – Hyperborean, Native American, and artificial languages
 Subclass PN – Literature (General)
 Subclass PQ – French literature – Italian literature – Spanish literature – Portuguese literature
 Subclass PR – English literature
 Subclass PS – American literature
 Subclass PT – German literature – Dutch literature – Flemish literature since 1830 – Afrikaans literature -Scandinavian literature – Old Norse literature: Old Icelandic and Old Norwegian – Modern Icelandic literature – Faroese literature – Danish literature – Norwegian literature – Swedish literature
 Subclass PZ – Fiction and juvenile belles lettres

Class Q – Science

 Subclass Q – Science (General)
 Subclass QA – Mathematics
 Subclass QB – Astronomy
 Subclass QC – Physics
 Subclass QD – Chemistry
 Subclass QE – Geology
 Subclass QH – Natural history – Biology
 Subclass QK – Botany
 Subclass QL – Zoology
 Subclass QM – Human anatomy
 Subclass QP – Physiology
 Subclass QR – Microbiology

Class R – Medicine 

 Subclass R – Medicine (General)
 Subclass RA – Public aspects of medicine
 Subclass RB – Pathology
 Subclass RC – Internal medicine
 Subclass RD – Surgery
 Subclass RE – Ophthalmology
 Subclass RF – Otorhinolaryngology
 Subclass RG – Gynecology and Obstetrics
 Subclass RJ – Pediatrics
 Subclass RK – Dentistry
 Subclass RL – Dermatology
 Subclass RM – Therapeutics. Pharmacology
 Subclass RS – Pharmacy and materia medica
 Subclass RT – Nursing
 Subclass RV – Botanic, Thomsonian, and Eclectic medicine
 Subclass RX – Homeopathy
 Subclass RZ – Other systems of medicine

Class S – Agriculture

 Subclass S – Agriculture (General)
 Subclass SB – Horticulture. Plant propagation. Plant breeding
 Subclass SD – Forestry. Arboriculture. Silviculture
 Subclass SF – Animal husbandry.  Animal science
 Subclass SH – Aquaculture. Fisheries. Angling
 Subclass SK – Hunting

Class T – Technology

 Subclass T – Technology (General)
 Subclass TA – Engineering Civil engineering (General).
 Subclass TC – Hydraulic engineering. Ocean engineering
 Subclass TD – Environmental technology. Sanitary engineering
 Subclass TE – Highway engineering. Roads and pavements
 Subclass TF – Railroad engineering and operation
 Subclass TG – Bridges
 Subclass TH – Building construction
 Subclass TJ – Mechanical engineering and machinery
 Subclass TK – Electrical engineering. Electronics. Nuclear engineering
 Subclass TL – Motor vehicles. Aeronautics. Astronautics
 Subclass TN – Mining engineering. Metallurgy
 Subclass TP – Chemical technology
 Subclass TR – Photography
 Subclass TS – Manufacturing engineering. Mass production
 Subclass TT – Handicrafts. Arts and crafts
 Subclass TX – Home economics

Class U – Military Science

 Subclass U – Military science (General)
 Subclass UA – Armies: Organization, distribution, military situation
 Subclass UB – Military administration
 Subclass UC – Military maintenance and transportation
 Subclass UD – Infantry
 Subclass UE – Cavalry. Armor
 Subclass UF – Artillery
 Subclass UG – Military engineering. Air forces
 Subclass UH – Other military services

Class V – Naval Science

 Subclass V – Naval science (General)
 Subclass VA – Navies: Organization, distribution, naval situation
 Subclass VB – Naval administration
 Subclass VC – Naval maintenance
 Subclass VD – Naval seamen
 Subclass VE – Marines
 Subclass VF – Naval ordnance
 Subclass VG – Minor services of navies
 Subclass VK – Navigation. Merchant marine
 Subclass VM – Naval architecture. Shipbuilding. Marine engineering

Class Z – Bibliography, Library Science

 Subclass Z – Books (General). Writing. Paleography. Book industries and trade. Libraries. Bibliography
 Subclass ZA – Information resources/materials

See also
 ACM Computing Classification System
 Books in the United States
 Brinkler classification
 Chinese Library Classification
 Database of Recorded American Music
 Dewey Decimal Classification
 Comparison of Dewey and Library of Congress subject classification
 Harvard–Yenching Classification
 Moys Classification Scheme
 ISBN
 Minnie Earl Sears, formulated Sears Subject Headings, simplified for use by small libraries

Notes

References

External links 

 Library of Congress classification outline, loc.gov
 Full list of LCC classification schedules, loc.gov
 Library of Congress – classification, loc.gov
 Cataloging Distribution Services – source of Library of Congress Classification schedules. loc.gov
 Classification outline, loc.gov
 How to read LCC call numbers, geography.about.com (via The Wayback Machine)
 How to use LCC to organize a home library, zackgrossbart.com